Malik Reneau (born April 1, 2003) is an American college basketball player for the Indiana Hoosiers of the Big Ten Conference. He previously played for Montverde Academy, where he helped lead his team to back-to-back GEICO High School Basketball National titles (2021 and 2022). He is ranked as one of the top 30 recruits in the 2022 recruiting class and the Big Ten's top-ranked freshman forward.

High school career
Reneau played for national powerhouse Montverde Academy in Florida, coached by Kevin Boyle. At Montverde, with fellow Hoosier commit Jalen Hood-Schifino, Reneau won back-to-back GEICO High School Basketball National titles (2021 and 2022). He averaged 11.9 points and 6.6 rebounds as a senior, with 14.3 points and 8.3 rebounds at the GEICO High School Nationals, including a double-double with 14 points and 12 rebounds in the championship game.

Reneau was named an all-star and invited to play in the Jordan Brand Classic, where he scored 10 points and garnered nine rebounds. In the off-season prior to college he also played for the Nightrydas Elite grassroots program on the Nike EYBL circuit, averaging 17.2 points, 8.5 rebounds, and 2.4 assists in 12 games.

Recruiting
Reneau originally decided to go with the Florida Gators, but he changed his mind when head coach Mike White took a job opportunity with the Georgia Bulldogs. Hoosiers point guard and fellow Montverde teammate Jalen Hood-Schifino prompted Indiana coaches to begin recruiting Reneau. Hood-Schifino recalled, "I was with him when he de-committed. As soon as that happened, I texted my coaches. I was like, we have to get Malik. As soon as I said that, the coaches got on him and they did a great job of recruiting him."

College career
Reneau, like his teammate Trayce Jackson-Davis, is left-handed.

Career statistics

College

Personal life
Reneau was born to Patrick and Melanie Reneau. His mother, who played college basketball, often joined his father in challenging him in one-on-one games.

As part of a student athlete compensation package to raise awareness for Indiana charity partners, Reneau endorsed Big Brothers Big Sisters of Central Indiana, offering in-person appearances (such as speaking, presentation of skills, autograph sessions, and the like) as well as social media posts promoting these appearances and the charity.

References

External links
Indiana Hoosiers bio

2003 births
Living people
American men's basketball players
Basketball players from Miami
Forwards (basketball)
Indiana Hoosiers men's basketball players